The women's 100 metre backstroke S6 event at the 2012 Paralympic Games took place on 30 August, at the London Aquatics Centre.

Two heats were held, with eight swimmers each. The swimmers with the eight fastest times advanced to the final.

Heats

Heat 1

Heat 2

Final

References

Swimming at the 2012 Summer Paralympics
2012 in women's swimming